Francis Joseph Lynch (15 March 1909 – 10 May 1980) was a British trade union leader and politician.

Lynch was active in the Labour Party from an early age, and served on the City of Salford council from 1934 until 1949.  In 1937, he found work as a night patrolman and stoker at the County Mental Hospital in Prestwich, and joined the Hospital and Welfare Services Union.  In 1946, this became part of the Confederation of Health Service Employees (COHSE), and Lynch became a full-time organiser for the new union.  In 1948, he was appointed as a regional secretary, then in 1954 he became a national officer, and in 1967 was elected as the union's assistant general secretary.

Lynch was elected as general secretary of COHSE in 1969, and set himself a target of doubling the union's membership of 69,000.  He achieved this; when he retired, in 1974, membership had risen to 230,000.

References

1909 births
1980 deaths
General Secretaries of the Confederation of Health Service Employees
Councillors in Greater Manchester
Labour Party (UK) councillors
People from Salford